Statistics of the V-League in the 1991 season.

First stage
19 participants divided into 3 groups playing double round robin;
8 clubs qualified for quarterfinals, while 6 clubs entered relegation
playoffs, 3 clubs going down

Semifinal (June 5, 1991)
Quang Nam   2-1 Saigon Port

Saigon Port finished 3rd

Final
Hai Quan (TP Ho Chi Minh)     2-0 Cong an (Hai Phong)

Second stage

8 participants playing double round robin; top-4 to semifinals

Winners: Quang Nam (Da Nang)

References

Vietnamese Super League seasons
1
Viet
Viet